Temple of Love may refer to:

 "Temple of Love" (BWO song), 2006
 "Temple of Love" (The Sisters of Mercy song), 1983
Temple de l'Amour, a structure at the Palace of Versailles